Malaysians in India consists of expatriates and international students from Malaysia as well as Indian citizens who are of Malaysian descent. Most of them are Malaysians of Indian origin. As of 2015, an estimated 12,442 Malaysians, mostly working for Malaysian-based companies as well as students, reside in India, mainly in South India.

Distribution

Karnataka 
There are several hundred Malaysians in Karnataka, most of them are students in Bangalore, Mangalore, Manipal and Hassan medical and engineering colleges. There are around 400 Malaysians registered in Bangalore. Most of them came there to study medicine. While most of them are students, there are also some business families in the city as well.

Tamil Nadu 
There are several Malaysian families and students residing in Chennai. A number of Malaysians work in the private sectors such as AZRB Construction, TDM Infrastructure, BMW, Nokia, and Hyundai. There are also Malaysian students studying in colleges such as the Saveetha Dental College, Ragas Dental College, Meenakshi Ammal Dental College, Sri Ramacanchra Medical College, St Joseph College and Loyola College.

Notable people 
 Malaysia Vasudevan - Tamil playback singer and actor
 Prashanthini - Tamil playback singer
 Ravichandran - Tamil film actor
 Syed Thajudeen - Artist
 Yugendran - Film actor and singer

See also 
 India–Malaysia relations
 Sri Lankan Malays
 Consulate General of Malaysia, Chennai
 Malaysian Indian
 Singaporeans in India

References 

India
 
 
Malaysian